The 2008 New Hampshire Wildcats football team represented the University of New Hampshire in the 2008 NCAA Division I FCS football season. The Wildcats were led by 10th-year head coach Sean McDonnell and played their home games at Cowell Stadium in Durham, New Hampshire. They were a member of the Colonial Athletic Association. They finished the season 10–3, 6–2 in CAA play . They received an at-large bid into the FCS playoffs where they lost in the quarterfinals to Northern Iowa.

Schedule

References

New Hampshire
New Hampshire Wildcats football seasons
New Hampshire Wildcats football